Pont Pla  is a bridge located in Escaldes-Engordany Parish, Andorra. It is a heritage property registered in the Cultural Heritage of Andorra. It was built in the 18th century.

References

Escaldes-Engordany
Bridges in Andorra
Cultural Heritage of Andorra